Jack Edwards (born 19 April 2000) is an Australian cricketer who plays for New South Wales as an all-rounder. In 2018 he held a rookie contract for New South Wales. In December 2017, he was named in Australia's squad for the 2018 Under-19 Cricket World Cup.

He made his first-class debut for New South Wales in the 2018–19 Sheffield Shield season on 16 October 2018. He made his Twenty20 debut for Sydney Sixers in the 2018–19 Big Bash League season on 22 December 2018.

References

External links

 

Living people
Australian cricketers
2000 births
New South Wales cricketers
Sydney Sixers cricketers